Wadi al-Rummah or ar-Rummah (ar: وادي الرمة) is one of the Arabian Peninsula's longest river valleys, at a length of almost . Now mostly dry and partly blocked by encroaching sand dunes, the wadi arises near Medina at Jibāl al Abyaḑ (Al-Abyad Mountain, or The White Mountain). It heads towards the north-east, connecting to several smaller wadis, like Mohalla Wadi and Murghala Wadi to the north and Jifn Wadi and Jarir Wadi to the south. It ends at Thuayrat Dunes of the ad-Dahna Desert in Al-Qassim Province near Buraidah.

The wadi then sinks beneath the sand dunes, where it is called Mistewy Wadi.  It emerges on the other side of the desert as Wadi al-Batin (approx. ), which continues towards the north-east and forms the western boundary of Kuwait. It empties finally into the Persian Gulf.

The valley is wide, for it was once a major river valley. Periods of drought and the movement of sand at Althwairat and Dahna led to the course of the valley being cut into three parts: Wadi al-Rummah  (the longest, at ), Wadi Aloddi, and Wadi al-Batin. Geological studies show that Wadi al-Rummah flows at full capacity about three times every 100 years. It flowed most recently in 1945, 1982, 1987, 2004, 2008 and 2018. In 1818, the river valley was flooded for 40 days, in 1838 for 22 days, in 1987 and 2008 for 17 days. In 1838 the wadi overflowed, creating a  lake that persisted for two years and attracted water birds which had rarely been seen in the valley.

References

Further reading
 Farouk El-Baz (Boston University), "A river in the desert", Discover, July 1993.

External links

 countrystudies.us – Saudi Arabia: Topography and Natural Regions (Source: U.S. Library of Congress)
 youtube.com – Flow in November 2008 between Unaizah and Buraidah, Qassim province
 mekshat.com – Photo of 2008 flow

Geography of Saudi Arabia
Valleys of Saudi Arabia
Rummah